AMCS may refer to:

 The Australian Marine Conservation Society
 The International Journal of Applied Mathematics and Computer Science

pl:AMCS